John Charles "Johnny" Jameson (born 11 March 1958, Belfast) is a former Northern Ireland international footballer who played for Glentoran.

During his club career he played for Bangor, Huddersfield Town, Linfield, and Glentoran. He was part of the team at the 1982 FIFA World Cup when Northern Ireland reached the second round. However, he did not earn any senior caps, as his deeply held religious beliefs restricted his international career as he refused to play on a Sunday.

Like a number of professional Northern Irish footballers Jameson hailed from Rathcoole, near Belfast.

External links
Northern Ireland's Footballing Greats: Johnny Jameson

1958 births
Living people
Association footballers from Belfast
Association footballers from Northern Ireland
1982 FIFA World Cup players
Bangor F.C. players
Huddersfield Town A.F.C. players
Linfield F.C. players
Glentoran F.C. players
English Football League players
Association football midfielders